A Postcard from an Australian Summer is the live extended play (EP) by Australian singer songwriter Ziggy Alberts. The EP was recorded during his 2019 World Tour and released in July 2019. 

Upon released, Alberts said "A Postcard from an Australian Summer is a celebration... We share something pretty special, me and you; I think we do a pretty great job at closing the gap between the crowd and stage." adding "It's hard to describe these moments we have at my live shows: I might be biased, but I think its a really unique experience – so I made this postcard to celebrate just that."

Reception

Tammy Walters from Forte Magazine said "Pure and wholesome goodness for the soul, A Postcard from an Australian Summer is a thank you letter from Ziggy Alberts to his fans" saying "the only downfall of this live EP - [is that] it wasn't long enough."

Track listing

Release history

References

2019 EPs
Indie pop EPs
EPs by Australian artists
Live EPs
Live albums by Australian artists
Ziggy Alberts albums